Chairman of China may refer to:

Chairman of the Central Military Commission (China)
Chairman of the Central People's Government of the People's Republic of China (1949–1954)
Chairman of the Chinese Communist Party, historical title now called the General Secretary of the Chinese Communist Party
Chairperson of the Chinese People's Political Consultative Conference
Chairman of the National Government of the Republic of China
Chairman of the People's Republic of China, historical title now called the President of the People's Republic of China
Chairman of the Standing Committee of the National People's Congress